William Sutherland Dun (1 July 1868 – 7 October 1934) was an Australian palaeontologist, geologist and president of the Royal Society of New South Wales.

Dun was the son of Major Percy Henderson Dun, formerly of the East India Company's army, and his wife Catherine Eliza Jane, and was born at Cleveland House, Cheltenham, England. The family moved to Australia in 1869, and Dun was educated at Newington College (1882-1886) and the University of Sydney.

On 8 April 1890 Dun was employed as a probationer in the Geological Survey of New South Wales and was an assistant to Edgeworth David in his work on the Hunter River coalfield. Dun owed most of his training to Robert Etheridge, Junior. In 1892 Dun passed his final examinations in geology and palaeontology with first-class honours and in 1893 was made assistant palaeontologist to the geological survey. In 1899 he was appointed palaeontologist to the survey and in 1902 became lecturer in palaeontology to the University of Sydney.

Dun was president of the Linnean Society of New South Wales in 1913 and 1914, and president of the Royal Society of New South Wales for the year 1918-19. He resigned from the geological survey in 1933 but continued his university lectureship until his death. He died on 7 October 1934 of cancer and was survived by his second wife (Mabel, née Edgar), and four children — a son and daughter each from both marriages. His writings can be found in the Records of the Geological Survey of New South Wales.

References

D. F. Branagan, T. G. Vallance, 'Dun, William Sutherland (1868 - 1934)', Australian Dictionary of Biography, Vol.8, MUP, 1981, p. 364. Retrieved on 4 October 2008.

1868 births
1934 deaths
Australian paleontologists
Australian geologists
People educated at Newington College